Parotocinclus minutus is a species of catfish in the family Loricariidae. It is native to South America, where it occurs in the Vasa-Barris River basin. The species reaches 3.3 cm (1.3 inches) SL.

References 

Fish described in 1977
Fish of South America
Otothyrinae